Westgate is a community within the Hilltop area of Columbus, Ohio. It was partially constructed on land that formerly housed the American Civil War Camp Chase and a Confederate prison. After the Civil War, the land was purchased by Joseph Binns and his associates with the intent to start a Quaker community. These plans failed to materialize and the land was developed as a "streetcar suburb" in the 1920s.

The Columbus Dispatch named Westgate one of the most affordable neighborhoods in the City of Columbus in October 2008.

Westgate is located 4 miles (6.4 km) west of Downtown Columbus and is bounded by W. Broad Street to the north, Demorest Road to the west, Sullivant Avenue to the south, and Hague to the east.

History

Camp Chase 

One third of Westgate sits on land that was formerly Camp Chase during the Civil War. This camp was opened in 1861 and served as training grounds for the Union Army. It is named after the former governor of Ohio and Secretary of the Treasury, Salmon P. Chase. Eventually it was converted to a prisoner of war camp to hold captured Confederate soldiers. At the beginning it held 250 prisoners, but after many expansions it became large enough to house 9,146 men. The camp was emptied of all prisoners on July 5, 1865.

Camp Chase Cemetery 

The only thing remaining from Camp Chase today is the cemetery. The cemetery is one of only two remaining federal properties from the Civil War that is located in Columbus. Memorial services began in 1895, and continue to the present day. The headstones were placed in the cemetery between 1906 and 1908 by a marble company in Nelson, Georgia. These headstones do not mark individual graves, but rather exist to represent those that died. Residents began having an annual bean dinner around the cemetery in the 1930s in order to remember and honor those that gave their life in the war. This event continues today and takes place on the last Saturday in June. The Hilltop Historical Society holds an annual memorial service at the cemetery on the second Sunday of June. This event includes reenactment soldiers and characters from the time. The cemetery is currently on the National Registrar of Historic Places and is maintained by the Dayton National Cemetery.

Short Creek Quarterly Meeting of the Quaker Church 
Shortly after the Civil War, members of the Short Creek Quarterly meeting of the Quaker Church showed their interest in the ensuing auction of a 463.5-acre plot of land in the Hilltop area. Their intention was to use this land to create their dream Quaker settlement.  Five Quaker men came to the site in 1870 in order to determine whether or not it met their needs. They determined this land to be suitable and consequently returned to purchase it in 1872. This purchase took place on January 23 and cost $87.50 per acre. Many notable Quakers moved here such as John Cowgill, John Hussey, and William H. Harris. Many of the streets in Westgate today are named for these Quaker settlers.

Founding 
In 1905, after the end of the Civil War and subsequent purchase of the Camp Chase property by Quaker settlers, the land was sold to a real estate agency and subdivided for housing.  Building of homes began in the 1920s and by the mid-1920s Westgate was established as one of Columbus' streetcar suburbs.

Structures and landmarks 

Westgate Park is a 46.3-acre city park located in the center of the Westgate neighborhood. It features a fishing pond, a rain garden, and a playground, as well as picnic areas, an open shelterhouse, a walking trail, and a wooded area.  The Westgate Shelterhouse is available by reservation through the City of Columbus Recreation and Parks department.  It accommodates 180 people and provides heating and air conditioning, a bridal changing room, a covered porch, a fireplace, a foyer, a kitchen, restrooms, tables and chairs, and handicap access.

Westgate Community Recreation Center has amenities including an art room, an auditorium, a ceramics room, a crafts room, a dance room, a fitness room, a game room, a gymnasium, a gymnastics room, a handball court, a kitchen, a lobby area, meeting rooms, a volleyball court, and a weight room.  Athletic fields and courts for tennis, basketball, baseball, soccer, football, etc. are located outside of the facility.

Westgate United Methodist Church is a medium-sized church located at 61 South Powell Avenue. It sits immediately north of West High school. Their mission is to help people to find their way back to God. They have been offering regular weekly services since their foundation in 1927.

Parkview United Methodist Church is centrally located just north of Westgate park. This church was very important in the plan for the neighborhood. This can be seen in the multiple streets that converge around it as well as in its prominent placement in relation to the park. It was constructed in 1941.

Events 
Summer Jam West is a free arts and music festival held annually in Westgate Park on the second Saturday in July. There are live bands, local art for sale, hand crafted items for sale, free face painting for the kids and a free art zone.  Summer Jam is open to all.  The focus is on bringing art and music to the Hilltop.

Hilltop Bean Dinner is an annual event held in late June where the Hilltop community congregates in Westgate park to share a meal. This event consists of music, art vendors, historic car shows, and most importantly the bean dinner. This event attracts many people from outside of the Westgate and greater Hilltop area as it is one of the primary annual events in the area.

The Westgate Home and Garden Tour is held on the second Saturday in June, from 2:00 – 6:00 PM.

The Westgate Farmers Market is held on the first and third Saturdays of each month, June through October, from 9:00 AM – 12:00 PM at the West Gate Masonic Lodge.''

Education 

Westgate Alternative Elementary School is a public kindergarten-through-5th-grade elementary school located at 3080 Wicklow Road in Westgate. Its mission statement reads: "Each student is highly educated, prepared for leadership and service, and empowered for success as a citizen in a global community."  The school's standardized test performance ranks it 962nd among the 1596 Ohio public elementary schools and 7th among the 74 ranked elementary schools in the Columbus City School District.

Saint Mary Magdalene School is a private elementary school that teaches grades kindergarten through 8th. It was established in 1928 and has continually taught students since. The school consists of six buildings which are centrally located on a main campus. It is supported by the Ohio Catholic School Accreditation Association and the State of Ohio.

West High School is a public high school that teaches grades 9–12 and is located at 179 S Powell Ave, Columbus, OH. It shares the same mission statement as Westgate Alternative Elementary School. Their colors are buff and brown and their mascot is the cowboy. In 2014 the school was ranked 708th out of 756 high schools for standardized tests as its average reading score was 76.3. This is up from 2012 when the school was ranked 733rd and had an average reading test score of 69.5.

Residential 

Westgate is a very popular neighborhood for first time home buyers because of its location, aesthetic style, and low cost. In 2008 the average cost of a house in Westgate was 120,000 dollars. The majority of the residences in Westgate are single family houses that are owned by their occupants. The typical Westgate house is a cottage style with 2–3 bedrooms and is no taller than two stories. Most houses have either a brick or plaster facade as well as roofs with multiple peaks. This design helps to accentuate the homey feel of the neighborhood.  The uniqueness of each home in Westgate as well as the community's emphasis on façade and yard aesthetics has attracted residents who enjoy the freedom to use original and eclectic design styles.

Westgate has been described as "a nice neighborhood, with a family oriented atmosphere." Westgates residents are very diverse socially but tend to be middle class and young. Currently there is a new wave of people moving to Westgate who are in search of a Clintonville home at a cheap price. Westgate provides these home buyers the perfect option because each of its houses is unique and full of character. The main problem that residents face is the public school system. Both the elementary and high school in Westgate are ranked in the bottom half of public schools in Ohio. Due to this many families move out of Westgate when their kids become old enough to start attending school. The residents of Westgate are actively trying to improve their community as seen by their successful attempt in forming a neighborhood association. Westgate is a quaint, young, unique neighborhood that provides a multitude of benefits to its residents.

The Westgate Neighbors' Association is a non-profit community civic organization formed in February 2008. It is made up of residents in and around the Westgate neighborhood to improve livability in the neighborhood.

Gallery

References

External links

 Friends of the Hilltop
 Westgate Neighbors Association
 Highland West Neighbors Association
 August 2008 Columbus Dispatch Article - "An Affordable Oasis", Part of Top Ten Columbus Neighborhoods to Live In 
 Summer Jam West
 Columbus Westside Running Club
 Westgate Farmers Market

Westgate